The 2019 election to the Newry, Mourne and Down District Council, part of the Northern Ireland local elections that were held on 2 May 2019 returned 41 members to the council via Single Transferable Vote.

Election results

Note: "Votes" are the first preference votes.

The overall turnout was 55.25% with a total of 69,339 valid votes cast. A total of 1,090 ballots were rejected.

Districts summary

|- class="unsortable" align="centre"
!rowspan=2 align="left"|Ward
! % 
!Cllrs
! %
!Cllrs
! %
!Cllrs
! %
!Cllrs
! %
!Cllrs
! % 
!Cllrs
!rowspan=2|TotalCllrs
|- class="unsortable" align="center"
!colspan=2 bgcolor="" | Sinn Féin
!colspan=2 bgcolor=""| SDLP
!colspan=2 bgcolor="" | UUP
!colspan=2 bgcolor="" | DUP
!colspan=2 bgcolor="" | Alliance
!colspan=2 bgcolor="white"| Others
|-
|align="left"|Crotlieve
|bgcolor="#008800"|29.8
|bgcolor="#008800"|2
|27.0
|2
|6.2
|0
|3.2
|0
|4.2
|0
|29.5
|2
|6
|-
|align="left"|Downpatrick
|25.2
|1
|bgcolor="#99FF66"|40.6
|bgcolor="#99FF66"|3
|4.7
|0
|2.0
|0
|5.1
|0
|22.3
|1
|5
|-
|align="left"|Newry
|bgcolor="#008800"|44.8
|bgcolor="#008800"|3
|21.3
|2
|3.4
|0
|0.0
|0
|7.3
|0
|23.2
|1
|6
|-
|align="left"|Rowallane
|8.0
|0
|15.6
|1
|19.4
|1
|bgcolor="#D46A4C"|29.0
|bgcolor="#D46A4C"|2
|18.2
|1
|9.7
|0
|5
|-
|align="left"|Slieve Croob
|bgcolor="#008800"|36.5
|bgcolor="#008800"|2
|20.5
|1
|15.9
|1
|10.6
|0
|10.6
|1
|5.9
|0
|5
|-
|align="left"|Slieve Gullion
|bgcolor="#008800"|62.7
|bgcolor="#008800"|5
|21.6
|1
|10.3
|1
|2.5
|0
|2.9
|0
|0.0
|0
|7
|-
|align="left"|The Mournes
|bgcolor="#008800"|34.2
|bgcolor="#008800"|3
|18.0
|1
|12.0
|1
|16.1
|1
|7.8
|0
|12.0
|1
|7
|-
|- class="unsortable" class="sortbottom" style="background:#C9C9C9"
|align="left"| Total
|36.5
|16
|23.0
|11
|10.0
|4
|8.5
|3
|7.4
|2
|14.4
|5
|41
|-
|}

District results

Crotlieve

2014: 3 x SDLP, 2 x Sinn Fein, 1 x Independent
2019: 2 x SDLP, 2 x Sinn Fein, 2 x Independent
2014-2019 Change: Independent gain from SDLP

Downpatrick

2014: 3 x SDLP, 1 x Sinn Fein, 1 x Independent
2019: 3 x SDLP, 1 x Sinn Fein, 1 x Independent
2014-2019 Change: No change

Newry

2014: 3 x Sinn Fein, 2 x SDLP, 1 x Independent
2019: 3 x Sinn Fein, 2 x SDLP, 1 x Independent
2014-2019 Change: No change

Rowallane

2014: 2 x DUP, 1 x Alliance, 1 x SDLP, 1 x UUP
2019: 2 x DUP, 1 x Alliance, 1 x SDLP, 1 x UUP
2014-2019 Change: No change

Slieve Croob

2014: 2 x Sinn Fein, 1 x Alliance, 1 x SDLP, 1 x DUP
2019: 2 x Sinn Fein, 1 x Alliance, 1 x SDLP, 1 x UUP
2014-2019 Change: UUP gain from DUP

Slieve Gullion

2014: 4 x Sinn Fein, 2 x SDLP, 1 x UUP
2019: 5 x Sinn Fein, 1 x SDLP, 1 x UUP
2014-2019 Change: Sinn Fein gain from SDLP

The Mournes

2014: 2 x Sinn Fein, 2 x SDLP, 1 x DUP, 1 x UUP, 1 x UKIP
2019: 3 x Sinn Fein, 1 x SDLP, 1 x DUP, 1 x UUP, 1 x Independent
2014-2019 Change: Sinn Fein gain from SDLP, Independent leaves UKIP

Changes during the term

† Co-options

‡ Changes in affiliation

– Suspensions
None

Last updated 26 October 2022.

Current composition: see Newry, Mourne and Down District Council

Notes

References

2019 Northern Ireland local elections
21st century in County Armagh
21st century in County Down
Elections in County Armagh
Elections in County Down